Scientific programming may refer to:

 Scientific programming language, a family of programming languages
 Scientific Programming, an academic journal